Anna of Austria may refer to:

Anna of Austria (1275–1327), daughter of Albert I, Duke of Austria; wife of Margrave Hermann of Brandenburg-Salzwedel & Henry VI, Duke of Breslau
 Anna of Austria (1318–1343), daughter of Frederick I of Austria and Isabella of Aragon, niece of previous
Anne, Duchess of Luxembourg (1432–1462), eldest daughter of Albert V, Duke of Austria and wife of William III, Duke of Luxembourg
Anna of Bohemia and Hungary (1503–1547), only daughter of Vladislaus II of Bohemia and Hungary and wife of Archduke Ferdinand I of Austria
Archduchess Anna of Austria (1528–1590), daughter of Ferdinand I, Holy Roman Emperor and Anna of Bohemia and Hungary; wife of Albert V, Duke of Bavaria
Anna of Austria, Queen of Spain (1549–1580), daughter of Maximilian II, Holy Roman Emperor and fourth wife of Philip II of Spain
Anne of Austria, Queen of Poland (1573–1598), daughter of Charles II, Archduke of Inner Austria and wife of King Sigismund III Vasa
Anna of Austria-Tirol (1585–1618), daughter of Ferdinand II, Archduke of Further Austria and wife of Matthias, Holy Roman Emperor, king of Bohemia
Anne of Austria (1601–1666), daughter of King Philip III of Spain and wife of King Louis XIII of France